The 2009 Bowling Green Falcons football team represented Bowling Green State University during the 2009 NCAA Division I FBS football season. They were led by first-year head coach Dave Clawson and  played in the East Division of the Mid-American Conference. They played their home games at Doyt Perry Stadium. They finished the season 7–6, 6–2 in MAC play to finish in third place in the East Division. They were invited to the Humanitarian Bowl where they lost to Idaho.

Preseason

Coaching changes
On November 28, 2008, Athletic Director Greg Christopher announced that head coach Gregg Brandon had been fired after six seasons and 44–30 record, including a 31–18 conference record, which was the best of any MAC coach since 2003 and led the team to three bowl games (2–1) and shares of two East division championships.  Christopher stated that a culmination of on and off the field events led to Brandon's dismissal, nine months after Brandon received a three-year contract extension.  The on-field problems included the Falcons 6–6 record, which was very disappointing as the Falcons were favored to win the MAC East division, and a 1–4 home record which included losses to Miami (OH) and Eastern Michigan (who finished 2–10 and 3–9 respectively) and a 40–34 double-overtime loss to eventual MAC Champion Buffalo, after the Falcons led the game by 20 points entering the fourth quarter and gave up two touchdowns within the final three minutes of the game.  Off the field, eleven Falcons players found themselves in legal troubles, two of which were arrested on drug trafficking charges.  The program was also stripped of nine scholarships by the NCAA because of inadequate grades on the association's Academic Progress Report.  Christopher stated that Brandon's post-game tirade about the lack of student support and attendance after the Buffalo loss, did not factor into his decision to release the coach.

On December 7, 2008, the Falcons lost two valuable coaches to rival Toledo, as defensive coordinator Mike Ward and co-offensive coordinator Matt Campbell were brought to the Rockets by new head coach (and former BG assistant) Tim Beckman.  The two assistants left, because they were not guaranteed contracts after Gregg Brandon was fired.  Ward was a very influential tool in recruiting and a few recruits were expected to rescind their verbals to Bowling Green, because of his departure.

On December 12, 2008, athletic director Greg Christopher named Dave Clawson as the program's 17th head coach.  Clawson, served the previous season with Tennessee as the Volunteers' offensive coordinator and had been the head coach at Fordham and Richmond, winning three conference championships and two Div. I-FCS Coach of the Year awards.  Others that were considered for the job included former Oklahoma State defensive coordinator Tim Beckman (now head coach at Toledo), Ohio State defensive coordinator Luke Fickell, former Florida offensive coordinator Dan Mullen (now head coach at the University of Florida), Louisville defensive coordinator Ron English, LSU offensive line coach Greg Studrawa, Central Michigan assistant Zach Azzani, Missouri defensive coordinator Matt Eberflus and Purdue defensive coordinator Brock Spack

On January 27, 2009, Clawson announced eight additions to his coaching staff for the upcoming season.  The list included Shannon Morrison and Joe Trainer hired as co-defensive coordinators, Warren Ruggerio as offensive coordinator, John Hunter as running backs coach, John McDonnell as offensive line coach, Doug Philips as defensive ends coach, Sean Spencer as defensive tackles coach and special teams coordinator, and Clint Dowdle as director of football operations.  A month after being introduced as co-defensive coordinator, Joe Trainer left the Falcons to become head coach at Rhode Island, a school that he was previously an assistant and defensive coordinator.

On February 2, 2009, quarterbacks coach Jim Hofher left the Falcons to become offensive coordinator at Delaware.

Key losses
Clawson dismissed Senior defensive lineman Michael Ream for an undisclosed violation of team rules in April.  Ream, who had been suspended in 2007 due to violating team rules, was to be the only senior on Bowling Green's defensive line.  When asked about the dismissal, Clawson stated "We are disappointed that we had to take this step, but when a student-athlete makes a poor decision, he must live with the consequences of his decision."

The following are some of the key players (all but Ream having graduated) who will be no longer eligible to play in the 2009 season:

Offense:
 Brandon Curtis (OL)
 Jeff Fink (OL)
 Jermiah Kelley (WR)
 Aaron Kent (OL)
 Marques Parks (WR)
 Corey Partridge (WR)
 Eric Ransom (RB)
 Anthony Turner (RB)

Defense:
 Adrian Baker (DE)
 Diyral Briggs (DL)
 Nick Davis (DL)
 Erique Dozier (LB)
 Giovanni Fillari (DB)
 John Haneline (LB)
 Kenny Lewis (DB)
 Michael Ream (DL)*†
 Joe Schaefer (DL)
 Antonio Smith (DB)
 Nate Waldron (LB)
 Freddie Walker (DB)

Special Teams:
 Sinisa Vrvillo (K)

*-Underclassman
†-Dismissed from team

Recruiting

Schedule

Sources:

Roster

Game summaries

Troy 

The Dave Clawson era at Bowling Green began with a home contest against the Sun Belt's Troy Trojans in the first meeting between the two schools.  The game was also the first time that Bowling Green opened the season at home since 2003.  The Falcons came into the game as a 7-point underdog.

Troy received the opening kickoff and marched 80 yards down the field on ten plays in just under two minutes, led by Troy quarterback Levi Brown, who had played under Clawson at Richmond. Troy running back DuJuan Harris finished off the drive, running the ball in from two yards out to put Troy up 7–0.  The teams would trade punts on the next two drives before Bowling Green pushed the ball into Troy's territory.  After completing a pass on fourth and six to Troy's 25-yard line, Tyler Sheehan was intercepted by Troy defensive back Bryan Willis ending the Falcons' deepest drive of the first quarter.  Troy would push their lead to 14–0 after Brown hit wide receiver Jerrel Jernigan for a 13-yard touchdown.  The Falcons would answer on the following drive, as Sheehan hooked up with senior wide receiver Freddie Barnes for a 31-yard touchdown pass cutting Troy's lead to 14–7.  Late in the second quarter Troy drove deep into Bowling Green's territory, but their drive stalled at the Falcons' 17-yard line after the Trojans failed to convert on fourth and one.  The Falcons would run the clock out and end the half trailing 14–7

The Falcons would show a totally different look in the second half effectively shutting the door on the Troy's offense, including forcing a fumble and intercepting Brown twice.  The Falcons scored on their second drive of the third quarter, as Sheehan found Barnes for eight yards and their second touchdown of the game.  On the first play of the fourth quarter, senior defensive back Roger Williams intercepted a Levi Brown pass at Bowling Green's 29-yard line.  Bowling Green would take the lead on the following possession, as freshman kicker Jerry Phillips converted a 21-yard field goal making the score 17–14 in Bowling Green's favor.  Bowling Green would score on its second consecutive possession, as junior runningback Willie Geter capped off a 4 play, 49 yard drive with a one-yard rush, increasing the Falcons' lead to 24–14.  Bowling Green freshman defensive back Adrien Spencer sealed the win for Bowling Green after he picked Brown off on a fourth and four and took the ball back for a 64-yard interception return for a touchdown, increasing the score to 31–14.

During the game, Bowling Green senior wide receiver Freddie Barnes set the school record for most receptions in a game, as he collected 15 receptions for 157 yards and Clawson became the eighth consecutive coach to win their debut as the head coach at Bowling Green.

Missouri 

The Falcons' second game of the season came on the road against the Big 12's Missouri Tigers who came into the game ranked #25th in the nation.  The Falcons entered the game with a 3–1 series advantage, including a 20 – 13 victory the last time the two teams met at Faurot Field in 2001.  The Falcons came into the game as a 20-point underdog and were not expected to cause the Tigers much of a threat.

The Falcons would start off the game well reaching the red zone on three of their first five drives.  The Falcons would strike first as Tyler Sheehan hooked up with sophomore receiver Ray Hutson on a 10-yard touchdown pass late in the first quarter to complete a 10 play, 80-yard drive and give the Falcons a 7–0 lead.  On the first play of Missouri's ensuing possession, sophomore quarterback Blaine Gabbert fumbled the ball after being hit by Falcons' senior linebacker Cody Basler and the ball was recovered by junior defensive lineman Carlos Tipton at Missouri's 22-yard line.  The Falcons offense would waist the opportunity, going three and out, gaining three yards and having to settle for a 37-yard field goal from freshman kicker Jerry Phillips to push the Falcons lead to 10–0 at the end of the first quarter.  The Falcons would recover another fumble in Missouri's territory as senior defensive back Jahmal Brown forced Missouri junior defensive back to fumble the ball on a punt return and junior linebacker Neal Dahlman recovered the ball for the Falcons at Missouri's 18-yard line.  The Falcons would waist their second possession with a short field, going three and out for four yards and settling for a 32-yard field goal from Phillips to push the lead to 13–0.  The Tigers would get two field goals from sophomore kicker Grant Ressel (38, 46) to cut the Falcon lead to 13–6 at halftime.

Bowling Green would keep the foot on the pedal entering the second half, taking the opening possession of the half 73 yards on 11 plays capped off with a 1-yard touchdown run from Willie Geter to push the Falcons lead to 20–6.  From there, the Falcons offense would go stagnant, only gaining five first downs the rest of the game.  Missouri would wear down the Falcons' defense starting with an 11 play, 87 yard drive culminating in a 27-yard touchdown pass from Gabbert to Jarred Perry to cut the Falcons' lead to 20–13.  Missouri would continue to run down the Falcons scoring on their next two possessions with a 33-yard pass from Gabbert to Wes Kemp and a 1-yard run by Der Washington to give the Tigers the 27–20 lead.  The Falcons would have one last chance, taking possession at their own 16-yard line.  Sheehan would complete a 17-yard pass to senior receiver Chris Wright on the first play of the drive, but would only complete one of his next four passes as the Falcons turned the ball over on downs near midfield.

References

Bowling Green
Bowling Green Falcons football seasons
Bowling Green Falcons football